Colin Lawrence Noble (born 10 June 1965) is a British politician of the Conservative Party. He served as leader of the Suffolk Conservatives group and Leader of Suffolk County Council from May 2015 to May 2018.

Political and local government career
He was first elected as a County Councillor at a by-election for the county electoral division of Row Heath in the constituency of West Suffolk on 8 June 2006.

Colin was elected to Forest Heath District Council at the 2011 United Kingdom local elections as one of the two District Councillors for Lakenheath ward.

From 2011 to 2014, he was the Norfolk and Suffolk Area Chairman for the Conservative Party. In September 2017 Colin became the Deputy Chairman (Political) for the Eastern Region Conservatives.

He became Leader of the Conservative group on Suffolk County Council on 7 April 2015. At the annual general meeting of Suffolk County Council on 21 May 2015 he was duly elected Leader of Suffolk County Council. At the Suffolk County Council Conservative leadership election held on 11 May 2018 Colin was defeated by County Councillor Matthew Hicks and left office as Leader of Suffolk County Council on 24 May 2018 at its Annual General Meeting.

Colin was elected to the Conservative Councillors Association board in January 2019 and served on it as the county representative till January 2020.

In March 2019 he became a board member and Commissioner of the Independent Commission on Civil Aviation Noise, an advisory non-departmental public body, sponsored by the Department of Transport.

Personal life
Colin Noble was born in Newmarket, West Suffolk . His father, Lawrence Noble, died in a road accident in Suffolk in May 2016.

He attended school at King's Ely in Ely, Cambridgeshire. He lives in the village of Lakenheath in north-west Suffolk.

Electoral history

See also
 East of England Local Government Association
 Local government in Suffolk

References

External links
 Colin Noble - A Strong Voice for Suffolk
 Colin Noble - Wordpress Blog
 Colin Noble - Twitter
 Colin Noble - Facebook
 Suffolk Conservatives
 West Suffolk Conservatives - Councillor Colin Noble
 West Suffolk (Forest Heath District & St Edmundsbury Borough Councils) - Colin Noble (District Councillor for Lakenheath)
 Suffolk County Council - Colin Noble (Conservative Councillor for Row Heath)

1965 births
Conservative Party (UK) councillors
Members of Suffolk County Council
People from Lakenheath
Suffolk County Council
Living people
Leaders of local authorities of England